Möhlin-Riburg F.C. is a football club that played in Swiss football league system, based on Möhlin, Switzerland. The club was formed in 1933. The current slogan of the club is: "We like to play football!".

Notable former player is Ivan Rakitić, from 1992 to 1995.

References

External links
Official Website
Official Facebook
Swiss Football League